So You Think You Can Dance is a United States television reality program and dance competition airing on the Fox Broadcasting Company network. Season seven premiered on May 27, 2010. In the August 12 finale, contemporary/jazz dancer Lauren Froderman was named "America's Favorite Dancer" and received the grand prize of $250,000, as well as an appearance on the cover of Dance Spirit magazine and in print advertising for Gatorade. Contemporary dancer Kent Boyd was named runner-up.

Judging panel
Nigel Lythgoe and Adam Shankman returned as permanent judges and Cat Deeley returned to host. Mary Murphy stepped down from her judging position, but guest judged during Las Vegas week and made an appearance at the finale. Mia Michaels became the third permanent judge for this season. During the auditions, various guest judges joined Lythgoe, including Shankman and Michaels along with others. This was Michaels' only season as a permanent judge. It was announced in early 2011 that Murphy would return as a permanent judge for season 8. Michaels left because she felt she didn't fit well on the panel and wanted to do her own work without being linked to the show.

Auditions

Open auditions

Las Vegas week 
Judges: Nigel Lythgoe, Mary Murphy, Adam Shankman, Toni Redpath, Lil' C, Tyce Diorio Day 1 kicks off with individual solos, Day 2 is hip-hop, Day 3 is cha-cha, Day 4 is broadway, Day 5 is group routines, Day 6 is Contemporary, and the final day is individual solos.

The Las Vegas callbacks were held at Planet Hollywood Resort and Casino in Las Vegas, Nevada.

Finals

Format changes
Executive producer Nigel Lythgoe has stated numerous format changes for this season.
Instead of naming a top 20 to compete in the finals, the show planned on selecting a top 10 - they ended up accepting an extra dancer to create a top 11. The contestants were informed of their inclusion in the finals by the judges either traveling to each dancer's home or personally telephoning them to reveal their fate. This is in contrast to previous seasons where the contestants walked down a long corridor to face the judging panel.

Rather than partnering up the contestants with each other, partners were chosen at random each week from a pool of All-Stars composed of top dancers that have appeared in previous seasons of the show, and the competitors performed in their All-Star partners' specialized style. Additionally, rather than eliminating a pair of contestants each week, contestants were voted on as individuals from the beginning of the competition, and only one was eliminated per week. Only three contestants were featured in the finale, as opposed to the usual four.

On June 16, 2010—the first performance show—host Cat Deeley revealed that the phone numbers viewers needed to dial to vote for their favorite contestant(s) were changed to 1-888-6BEST## from the usual 1-888-TEMPO##, ## being the numerical order of the contestant. This year also marks the first season in which, just like the results shows in all seasons prior, the performance shows were aired live, as opposed to being taped earlier in the week. This is also the first season to be broadcast in high-definition video.

Top 11 contestants

Female contestants

Male contestants

Elimination chart

Performance shows
The dancers that are marked in bold are contestants.

Meet the Top 11 (June 10, 2010)
Performances:

Week 1 (June 16, 2010)
Performances:

Week 2 (June 23, 2010)
Performances:

Week 3 (June 30, 2010)
Performances:

Solos:

Week 4 (July 7, 2010)
Performances:

 Shean was asked to step in due to an injury sustained by Allison Holker.
 Marla, the assistant choreographer, was asked to step in due to contestant Alex Wong sustaining an injury during rehearsal that would force his withdrawal from the competition.
Alex would have done the foxtrot with Anya, but due to his injury, it was cancelled.

Week 5 (July 14, 2010)
Performances:

Ashley was supposed to do a rumba routine with Pasha, but due to her injury, it was cancelled.

Week 6 (July 21, 2010)
Guest Judge: Kenny Ortega
Performances:

Billy was to be partnered with Courtney, unfortunately, the routine was cancelled due to his injury. He was still able to perform the following week.
Solos:

Week 7 (July 28, 2010)
Guest Judge: Toni Redpath
Performances:

Solos:

Week 8 (August 4, 2010)
Guest Judge: Tyce Diorio
Group dance (Top 4): "The Crapshooter's Dance" from Guys and Dolls
Performances:

Week 9 (August 11, 2010)

Solos:

Result shows

Results show musical performances

Week 1 (June 17, 2010)
Group dance: Top 11: "Acapella"—Kelis (Jazz; Choreographer: Tessandra Chavez)
Guest dancer(s): Keith Roberts and Karine Plantadit
Bottom 3's solos:

Week 2 (June 24, 2010)
Group dance: Top 10: "Royal T"—Crookers feat. Róisín Murphy (Jazz; Choreographer: Sonya Tayeh)
Guest dancer(s): RemoteKontrol featuring Bryan Gaynor dancing to Eskimo's "Agnus Dei"
Bottom 3's solos:

Week 3 (July 1, 2010)
Group dance: Top 9: "O Fortuna" from Carmina Burana—London Symphony Orchestra & Richard Hickox (Contemporary; Choreographer: Jamel Gaines)
Guest dancer(s):
Viva Elvis (Cirque du Soleil)
All-Stars Courtney Galiano & Mark Kanemura - "The Garden" from Season 4
Bottom 3's solos:

 Sullivan chose to dance a cappella.

Week 4 (July 8, 2010)
Group dance: "When We Dance"—Sting (Contemporary; Choreographer: Mia Michaels)
Guest dancer(s):
Touring cast of In the Heights: "96,000" from In the Heights (Choreographer: Andy Blankenbuehler)
All-Stars Pasha & Anya  - Cha-Cha from Season 3 Auditions; Song: "Magic Carpet Ride"—Mighty Dub Katz
Bottom 3's solos:

 Wong sustained an injury to his Achilles tendon during rehearsal and was unable to perform during the show on 7/7/2010.  He was therefore automatically placed in the bottom 3 and in danger of elimination.  Due to the seriousness of the injury, Wong needed surgery and 3 months of recuperation and was forced to leave the competition, causing both Bell and Galvan to be safe to continue into the next week.

Week 5 (July 15, 2010)
Group dance: "Charleston" from Billion Dollar Baby (Broadway; Choreographer: Tyce Diorio)
Guest dancer(s):
Fernando Martín-Gullans and Lauren Vayser from Mary Murphy's Champion Ballroom Academy ("Jailhouse Rock"—Elvis Presley); Jive
Jamar Roberts and Rachael McLaren from the Alvin Ailey American Dance Theater ("Gravity's Angel"—Laurie Anderson; Contemporary ballet)
All-Stars Twitch & Comfort: ("Forever"—Chris Brown; Choreographer: Dave Scott; Hip-hop)
Bottom 3's solos:

 Galvan sustained an injury to a rib on Monday July 12, 2010.  Unable to perform, she was automatically placed in the bottom 3 for the week.

Week 6 (July 22, 2010)
Group dance: "All That Jazz"—Lea DeLaria; Choreographer: Kelley Abbey
Guest dancer(s):
Soloists Yuriko Kajiya and Jared Matthews from American Ballet Theater-Don Quixote Act III Grand Pas de Deux
DJ Smart-Contemporary
All-Stars Lauren & Neil  - Jazz from Season 3 "Night of the Dancing Flame" - Róisín Murphy
Bottom 3's solos:

 The judges chose not to eliminate anyone, which means that two people are to be eliminated in week seven.

Week 7 (July 29, 2010)
Group dance: "Every Little Thing She Does Is Magic"—Sting (Contemporary; Choreographer: Mia Michaels)
Guest dancer(s): Cast of Step Up 3D, to "Already Taken" by Trey Songz, "My Own Step (Theme from Step Up 3D)" by Roscoe Dash & T-Pain featuring Fabo and "This Instant" by Sophia Fresh featuring T-Pain
Bottom 3's solos:

Week 8 (August 5, 2010)
Group dance (All-Stars): "Drumming Song"—Florence & the Machine (Contemporary; Choreographer: Dee Caspary)
Guest dancer(s): Desmond Richardson ("Sympathy for the Devil"—The Rolling Stones)
Solos:

Week 9 (Finale) (August 12, 2010)
Judges: Tyce Diorio, Kenny Ortega, Stacey Tookey, Mary Murphy, Adam Shankman, Mia Michaels, Nigel Lythgoe
Guest dancers:
Quest Crew ("Suzy"—Caravan Palace)
The Manzari Brothers and 7-year-old Luke (Tap)
Lil' C and Season 6's winner Russell Ferguson (Krumping; "Hazardous"—Buckmouth)
SYTYCD U.K. winner Charlie Bruce and Neil Haskell ("I Surrender"—Celine Dion; Choreographer: Mandy Moore)
Ellen DeGeneres and Stephen "Twitch" Boss in tribute to Alex Wong ("Outta Your Mind"—Lil Jon and LMFAO; Choreographers: Tabitha and Napoleon D'umo)
Group dances:

Judges' picks

Eliminated
Robert Roldan
Runner-up
Kent Boyd
Winner
Lauren Froderman

All-Stars Dance Pool
The All-Stars Dance Pool features some of the best and most popular dancers that have been featured on previous seasons. They acted as partners for the top eleven contestants this season, and rotated every week. Each of the dancers represents one specific style of dance and only danced in that genre with a partner. They did not choreograph any routines but learned them just as the contestants did.

  Allison had an old back injury flare up so for this dance she was replaced by Season 4's Katee Shean (3rd Place)
  McCormick was asked to step in for competing contestant Ashley Galvan, who suffered a rib injury and was unable to compete.
  Boss was asked to step in for competing contestant Billy Bell, who suffered a knee injury and did not compete.

 This dancer was eliminated this week.
 This dancer was in the bottom 2 this week
 This dancer was in the bottom 3 this week.
 This dancer did not perform this week due to injury making it the dancer's routine with all-star cancelled.
 Due to a dancer injury, this All-star stepped in to perform with the injured dancer's contestant partner.
 This All-Star did not perform this week and had someone else step in for them.
 This All-Star did not perform this week.
 This dancer won the competition

Tour 
The SYTYCD 2010 Season 7 tour took place in 40 cities across the US, creating many sold-out shows. It took place from the end of September to the end of November. The dancers from Season 7 for the tour were Lauren Froderman, Kent Boyd, Robert Roldan, AdéChiké Torbert, Billy Bell, Jose Ruiz, and Ashley Galvan. The all-stars for the tour were Allison Holker from Season 2, Dominic Sandoval from Season 3, Courtney Galiano from Season 4, Ade Obayomi from Season 5 and Kathryn McCormick from Season 6. Also featured was the winner of Season 6, Russell Ferguson.

Ratings

U.S. Nielsen ratings

See also 
 List of So You Think You Can Dance finalists

Notes

References

External links 
   Official "So You Think You Can Dance"   Website

2010 American television seasons
Season 07